The Martini Cadet is a centrefire single-shot cadet rifle produced in the United Kingdom by BSA and W.W. Greener for the use of Australian military Cadets. Although considered a miniature version of the Martini–Henry, the internal mechanism was redesigned by Auguste Francotte to permit removal from the receiver as a single unit. Chambered for the .310 Cadet cartridge (aka: .310 Greener), it was used from 1891 to 1955. They were also sold to the public thereafter, as the BSA No.4, 4a, 4b and 5 in other calibres like the .297/230 and .22 rimfire. The rifles will often chamber the similarly sized .32-20 Winchester and fire with some accuracy. However the 32/20 is actually 0.312 cal and the 310 is 0.323 cal. Due to this 10 thousandths difference the accuracy of a .32/20 round cannot be guaranteed.

After being sold by the Australian government many were converted to sporting or target rifles, often re-barrelled to calibres like .22 Hornet, .218 Bee, .25-20 Winchester, .222 Rimmed, .357 Magnum and others to .22 rimfire by gun makers like Sportco.

See also
British military rifles
Martini–Henry
Martini–Enfield
Sporterising

References

External links
  sportco.org.au
 UK NRA Historic Arms Resource Centre
 

Early rifles
Falling-block rifles
Hunting rifles